Louis Cachet (born Kristian Vikernes; 11 February 1973), better known as Varg Vikernes, is a Norwegian writer and retired musician best known for his early black metal albums and later crimes. His first five records, issued under the name Burzum from 1992 to 1996, made him one of the most influential figures in black metal. In 1994, he was convicted of murder and arson, and subsequently served 15 years in prison.

A native of Bergen, Vikernes began playing guitar at the age of 14 and formed his first band, Kalashnikov (later known as Uruk-Hai), by 1989. Around the same time, he would go on to join the band Old Funeral, in which he briefly played guitar from 1989 until his departure in 1991. He recorded multiple tracks with the band, which were featured on the Devoured Carcass EP, as well as various compilation albums released years later. After founding Burzum, he became part of the early Norwegian black metal scene. In 1992, Vikernes, along with other members of the scene, was suspected of burning down four Christian churches in Norway. Vikernes denied committing the arsons, though he supported them. In 1992–1993, he also recorded bass for Mayhem's debut album De Mysteriis Dom Sathanas.

In August 1993, Vikernes fatally stabbed Mayhem guitarist Euronymous during an altercation at the latter's apartment, and was arrested shortly after. In May 1994, Vikernes was convicted of first-degree murder, church arson and possession of explosives. Vikernes said the killing was self-defense and unsuccessfully argued for the charge to be reduced to voluntary manslaughter. He was sentenced to 21 years in prison, the maximum penalty under Norwegian law. During his incarceration, Vikernes launched the Norwegian Heathen Front, had two books published, and released two ambient albums as Burzum. In 2009, he was released on parole, after which he moved to France with his wife and children, where he has continued to write and make music. He was also an active video blogger on his YouTube channel ThuleanPerspective, before the channel was deleted.

Described by Sam Dunn as "the most notorious metal musician of all time", Vikernes remains controversial for his crimes as well as his political and religious views. He promoted views which combined Odinism and Esoteric Nazism, and openly embraced Nazism during the mid-late 1990s. He has since disavowed the ideology and its associated movements, although critics continue to label his views as far-right. Vikernes calls his beliefs "Odalism" and advocates a "pre-industrial European pagan society", opposing Christianity, Islam, Judaism, capitalism, socialism and materialism.

Biography

Background and childhood
In the interviews printed in the 1998 book Lords of Chaos, Vikernes discusses his background and childhood. Lords of Chaos also includes an interview with his mother, Helene Bore (the book and a newspaper depicted there refer to her with the given name Lene, whereas Vikernes' own website uses the name Helene). In a 2004 interview, Vikernes said his mother was "working in a large oil company". His father is an electronics engineer, and his older brother is a civil engineer.

In the Lords of Chaos interview, Vikernes recalls that when he was 6 years old, the family moved for about a year to Baghdad, Iraq, because Vikernes' "father was working for Saddam Hussein" developing a computer program. Since there were no places available in the English school in Baghdad, the young Vikernes went to an Iraqi elementary school during this time. According to his interview, Vikernes here became "aware of racial matters". Corporal punishment was very common in the school, and on one occasion, Vikernes had a "quarrel" with a teacher and called him "a monkey". But as Vikernes perceived it the teachers "didn't dare to hit me because I was white". Vikernes' mother also recalls that "the other children in his class would get slapped by their teachers; he would not". She mentions that this created problems, but generally she "has no good explanation" of how Varg developed his views.

When asked about his father, Vikernes states that he was hysterical that his son "had a swastika flag at home". Vikernes feels that his father was a hypocrite because he was worried about Vikernes "being a Nazi", whereas he too was "pissed about all the colored people he saw in town". About his mother, Vikernes states that she was "very race conscious", in the sense that she was afraid that Vikernes "was going to come home with a black girl!" At the time of the 1995 Lords of Chaos interview, Vikernes still had a positive relationship with his mother but "very little contact" with his father. He also stated that his parents are divorced; Vikernes' father is said to have "left about 10 years ago", which would have been 1985, when Vikernes was 11 or 12.

The Encyclopedia of White Power and historian Nicholas Goodrick-Clarke have both alleged that Vikernes was part of the neo-Nazi skinhead culture as an adolescent. When asked in the Lords of Chaos interview whether he hung out with skinheads in Bergen, Vikernes said that "there were no skinheads in Bergen".

According to an interview posted on his official website, Vikernes' facial scar was caused by a skiing accident when he was 11 years old.

A fan of classical music as a child, Tchaikovsky in particular, Vikernes started listening to heavy metal at 12, citing Iron Maiden as his biggest inspiration. Later he discovered other metal bands whose sound would be influential on his own band, such as Kreator, Sodom, Celtic Frost, Bathory, Destruction, Judas Priest, Megadeth, Slayer, Pestilence, Deicide and Von. Although Venom are widely considered the primary influence on black metal, Vikernes has always denied to be influenced by them, as well as defining the band as "a joke". He once wore a T-shirt of Venom's Black Metal to promote the genre but stated he later regretted doing that.

From an early age, Vikernes was also deeply fascinated with the fictional realm of Middle-earth created by J. R. R. Tolkien. His stage name, Grishnakh, is taken from that of an orc in The Two Towers, while the band name Burzum, meaning "darkness", was taken from the Black Speech inscribed on the One Ring in The Lord of the Rings. The inscription read "Ash nazg durbatulûk, ash nazg gimbatul, ash nazg thrakatulûk agh burzum-ishi krimpatul", or in English, "One Ring to rule them all, One Ring to find them, One Ring to bring them all and in the darkness bind them." Additionally, before joining the Bergen death metal band Old Funeral, he was in a band called Uruk-Hai, which was named for a type of orc from Tolkien's writing.

Early musical career

Vikernes started playing guitar at the age of 14. When he was 17, Vikernes came into contact with members of Old Funeral. He played guitar with them during 1990–1991 and performed on their Devoured Carcass EP before he began his solo musical project, Burzum, and quickly became involved with the early Norwegian black metal scene. During 1992–1993, he recorded four albums as Burzum.

Vikernes has stated that for the recording of these early albums he used an old Westone guitar, which he had bought in 1987 from an acquaintance. He used the cheapest bass guitar there was in his local shop and borrowed a drum kit from Old Funeral, the successor band Immortal, and "another musician living nearby". On Hvis lyset tar oss, he also borrowed Hellhammer's drum kit, the same one Hellhammer used to record De Mysteriis Dom Sathanas by Mayhem. He used a Peavey amplifier, but for the recording of Filosofem, he used the amplifier on his brother's stereo and some old fuzz pedals. For vocals, he would use whatever microphone the sound tech handed him, but during the recording of Filosofem, he intentionally used the worst mic they had, a headset mic. On the track "Dungeons of Darkness", he used the large gong at Grieghallen for background noise (Euronymous assisted him by beating his fists on it).

In 1992, Vikernes joined the black metal band Mayhem, a year after band member Dead committed suicide on 8 April 1991. Vikernes replaced bassist Necrobutcher, who quit the band because of Euronymous' treatment of Dead's suicide.

Vikernes has distanced himself from his black metal past, claiming he "came under the influence of an absolute degenerate loser, Øystein", and blaming his past actions and "degeneracy" on the negative influence of others in the scene. In a 2020 blog post, Vikernes wrote that he had many differences with others in the black metal scene from the beginning; they did not care for his political opinions or rifle collection, and he changed his beliefs to fit in.

Arson of churches

On 6 June 1992, the Fantoft Stave Church, dating from the 12th century and considered architecturally significant, was burned to the ground by arson. The cover of Burzum's EP Aske ("ashes") is a photograph of the destroyed church. By January 1993, arson attacks had occurred on at least seven other major stave churches, including one on Christmas Eve of 1992. Vikernes was found guilty of several of these cases: the arson and attempted arson of Åsane Church and Storetveit Church in Bergen, the arson of Skjold Church in Vindafjord, and the arson of Holmenkollen Chapel in Oslo. He was also charged with the arson of Fantoft Stave Church, although the jurors found him not guilty. The judges called this an error but did not overthrow the whole case.

At the time, media outlets reported that Vikernes was associated with theistic Satanism. In later interviews Vikernes, while not accepting responsibility for the arsons, said that they were not Satanic, but instead "revenge" for the Christian desecration of Viking graves and temples. According to Vikernes, the arsons were on the anniversary of the Lindisfarne Viking raid. Vikernes claimed that all the burnings, except for the one at Stavanger, were done by one person.

Bergens Tidende article
In January 1993, an article in one of Norway's biggest newspapers, Bergens Tidende, brought the black metal scene into the media spotlight. Two friends of Vikernes interviewed him and brought the interview to the newspaper, hoping they would print it. In the anonymous interview, "Count Grishnackh" (Vikernes) claimed to have burnt the churches and killed a man in Lillehammer. BT journalist Finn Bjørn Tønder set up a meeting with Count Grishnackh with help from the friends. The journalists were summoned to an apartment and reportedly warned that they would be shot if the police were called. There, Vikernes and his companions told the journalists that they had burnt the churches, or knew who had done it, and said that the attacks would continue. They claimed to be devil worshippers and said: "Our intention is to spread fear and devilry [...] that is why we are telling this to Bergens Tidende." They gave the journalists details about the arsons that hadn't been released to the press, so BT spoke with the police before publishing it, who confirmed these details.

The article was published on 20 January as the front page of the BT. It was headlined "We Lit the Fires" and included a photo of Vikernes, his face mostly hidden, holding two large knives. However, by the time the article was printed, Vikernes had already been arrested. The police found him by going to an address printed on a Burzum flyer.

According to Vikernes, the anonymous interview was planned by himself and Euronymous. The goal, he says, was to scare people, promote black metal, and get more customers for Helvete. At the time, Burzum was about to release the Aske mini-album. Some of the other scene members were also arrested and questioned, but all were released for lack of evidence. Jørn Inge Tunsberg of Hades said that the interview had "grave consequences" for the rest of the scene and that they did not know he was going to talk to the press, as "he had said nothing". He added that they became "bloody angry" and he, Tunsberg, was "pissed off".

Norwegian magazine Rock Furore published an interview with Vikernes in February 1993. In it, he said of the prison system: "It's much too nice here. It's not hell at all. In this country prisoners get a bed, toilet and shower. It's completely ridiculous. I asked the police to throw me in a real dungeon, and also encouraged them to use violence". He was released in March for lack of evidence.

Murder of Øystein Aarseth

In early 1993, animosity arose between Euronymous and Vikernes. After the Bergens Tidende episode, Euronymous decided to shut Helvete as it began to draw the attention of the police and media.

On the night of 10 August 1993, Vikernes stabbed Euronymous to death at his apartment in Oslo. The murder was initially blamed on Swedish black metallers by the media. It has been speculated that the murder was the result of a power struggle, a financial dispute over Burzum records (Euronymous owed Vikernes a large sum of royalty payments), or an attempt at "outdoing" a recent stabbing in Lillehammer committed by Emperor drummer Faust. Vikernes claims that he killed Euronymous in self-defense. He says that Euronymous had plotted to stun him with an electroshock weapon, tie him up, and torture him to death while videotaping the event. Vikernes explains: "If he was talking about it to everybody and anybody I wouldn't have taken it seriously. But he just told a select group of friends, and one of them told me". He said Euronymous planned to use a meeting about an unsigned contract to ambush him.

On the night of the murder, Vikernes and Snorre "Blackthorn" Ruch drove from Bergen to Euronymous' apartment at Tøyengata in Oslo. Blackthorn allegedly stood in the stairwell smoking while Vikernes went to Euronymous' apartment on the fourth floor. Vikernes said he met Euronymous at the door to hand him the signed contract, but when he stepped forward and confronted Euronymous, Euronymous "panicked" and kicked him in the chest. Vikernes claims Euronymous ran into the kitchen to fetch a knife. The two got into a struggle and Vikernes stabbed Euronymous to death. His body was found in the stairwell on the first floor with 23 stab wounds—two to the head, five to the neck, and 16 to the back. Vikernes claimed his final stab to the skull was so powerful the knife remained stuck in Euronymous' skull, but no physical evidence or bodily injuries supported his claim. Vikernes contended that most of Euronymous' wounds were caused by broken glass he had fallen on during the struggle. After the murder, Vikernes and Blackthorn drove back to Bergen. On the way, they stopped at a lake where Vikernes disposed of his bloodstained clothes. This claim of self-defense is doubted by Emperor drummer Faust, but Mayhem bassist Necrobutcher believed Vikernes did kill Euronymous due to the aforementioned death threats.

Blackthorn claimed Vikernes planned to murder Euronymous and pressured him into coming along. He claimed that, in the summer of 1993, he was almost committed to a mental hospital but fled to Bergen and stayed with Vikernes. Blackthorn said of the murder, "I was neither for nor against it. I didn't give a shit about Øystein". Vikernes, however, claims that he had not planned the killing and that Blackthorn came along to show Euronymous some new guitar riffs. Vikernes called Blackthorn's claims a "defense [...] to make sure I couldn't blame him [for the murder]".

Vikernes was arrested on 19 August 1993 in Bergen. The police found 150 kg of explosives and 3,000 rounds of ammunition in his home. According to the Encyclopedia of White Power, Vikernes "intended to blow up Blitz House, the radical leftist and anarchist enclave in Oslo", a plan that "was reportedly on the verge of execution." In an article originally published in 1999, Kevin Coogan also mentioned Vikernes' alleged intent to "destroy an Oslo-based punk anti-fascist squat called Blitz House", and stated "Vikernes may have felt that he had no choice but to kill Euronymous before bombing Blitz House because 'the Communist' would almost certainly have opposed such an act." Vikernes denied these claims in a 2009 interview, saying he was collecting explosives and ammunition "in order to defend Norway if we were attacked any time."

Trial
Vikernes' trial began on 2 May 1994; he was represented by the lawyer Stein-Erik Mattsson. Many other members of the scene, including Blackthorn and Faust, were put on trial around the same time. Some of them confessed to their crimes and implicated others. According to Lords of Chaos, "Vikernes is disgusted by the fact that, while he held fast to a code of silence, others confessed."

During the trial the media made Vikernes "the nation's first real bogeyman in fifty years". At the trial it was claimed that he, Blackthorn, and another friend had planned the murder. The court alleged that this third person stayed at the apartment in Bergen as an alibi; to make it look like they never left Bergen, he was to rent films, play them in the apartment, and withdraw money from Vikernes' credit card.

On 16 May 1994, Vikernes was sentenced to 21 years in prison (Norway's maximum penalty) for the murder of Euronymous, the arson of three churches, the attempted arson of a fourth church, and for the theft and storage of 150 kg of explosives. Though Vikernes only confessed to the theft and storage of the explosives, two churches were set on fire the day he was sentenced, "presumably as a statement of symbolic support". Blackthorn, who hadn't taken part in the murder as he had gone down the condominium's stairs to smoke, was sentenced to 8 years in prison for being an accomplice.

May 1994 also saw the release of Mayhem's album De Mysteriis Dom Sathanas, which has Euronymous on electric guitar and Vikernes on bass guitar. Before the release, Euronymous' family had asked Mayhem's drummer, Hellhammer, to remove the bass tracks recorded by Vikernes. Hellhammer said "I thought it was appropriate that the murderer and victim were on the same record. I put word out that I was re-recording the bass parts, but I never did."

Imprisonment

Vikernes served his sentence at the prisons in Bergen, Tønsberg, Ringerike, Trondheim, and Tromsø.

According to Swedish scholar Matthias Gardell in his book Gods of the Blood, Vikernes launched the Norwegian Heathen Front (Norsk Hedensk Front) during his early years in prison. Gardell says this was a pagan neo-Nazi group that grew into the international Pan-Germanic Heathen Front (Allgermanische Heidnische Front or AHF). According to Xavier Cattarinich, Vikernes was the "self-proclaimed leader" of the Norwegian Heathen Front and Goodrick-Clarke mentions that Vikernes underlined "his role as chieftain of his Norwegian Heathen Front" with the writing of Vargsmål. The Heathen Front officially denied that Vikernes was in charge. According to the authors of Lord of Chaos, this may have been to protect him, as Norwegian prisoners were prohibited from leading political groups. In addition, the organization's listed address was the same PO box Vikernes used in prison, which the authors state would have made it "very hard for him [Vikernes] to do an effective job" at leading the organization, as all letters would have been screened by the prison personnel. Vikernes said "I have never formed or been a member of such organizations. The only organization I am a member of is Riksmålsforbundet" (The Society for the Preservation of Traditional Standard Norwegian). He however came in contact with the neo-Nazi group Zorn 88, and wrote articles in its magazine Gjallarhorn. One of the group's leading members, esoterist Jan Erik Kvamsdahl helped Vikernes publish Vargsmål and set up the Heathen Front according to the Monitor organization.

On 8 April 1997, Norwegian police arrested five neo-Nazis in Hemnes. According to police, the young men were part of a self-styled "Einsatzgruppe" and were plotting attacks on political and religious figures in Norway. They also had plans to break Vikernes out of prison. The group "had all the trappings of a paramilitary unit", including guns, explosives, bulletproof vests, steel helmets and balaclavas. One of its members, Tom Eiternes, had befriended Vikernes in prison before escaping while on leave. Vikernes' mother, Lene Bore, was arrested for supplying the group with 100,000 kroner. She confessed, but claimed she did not know they were "right-wing extremists" and said her son was being attacked by fellow inmates. In late 1996, his jaw had reportedly been broken in a fight with another inmate. However, the prison director said her claims were unfounded, and police suspected that the money came from Vikernes himself. Lords of Chaos says that Vikernes adopted a "skinhead" look and wore a belt buckle with SS insignia around this time. Despite her confession, Bore was not convicted, and in 1998 the case against the "Einsatzgruppe" was dropped.

During his time in prison, Vikernes recorded two albums made up wholly of ambient and neofolk music. The first, Dauði Baldrs, was recorded in 1994–1995 and released in October 1997. The second, Hliðskjálf, was recorded in 1998 and released in April 1999. Vikernes was denied access to an electric guitar, bass guitar or drums, and instead used a synthesizer. In 2000, Vikernes decided to put Burzum on hold. He believed that his philosophy was constantly misinterpreted by an ignorant fan base that was too closely related to black metal and Satanism. Later, through his website, he indicated that he hoped to continue Burzum after his release from prison, stating: "I will publish a few books, possibly using a pseudonym in order to stay anonymous, and perhaps a Burzum album or two, but that's it". In the early 2000s Vikernes regularly wrote articles in the magazine of the neopagan neo-Nazi group Vigrid.

In August 2003, Vikernes was transferred from a maximum-security prison in Bergen to the low-security prison in Tønsberg. On 15 October, the local paper, Tønsbergs Blad, published an article that criticised Vikernes. On 26 October, Vikernes went on the run after being granted a short leave. He stopped a car in Numedal. Inside it was a family of three, who said that he hijacked the car at gunpoint. About 19 hours later, police stopped the car in Romerike and arrested him. The car contained knives, a gas mask, camouflage clothing, a portable GPS navigator, maps, a compass, a laptop and a mobile phone. Police also found a handgun and an AG3 automatic rifle in a cabin in Rollag, where Vikernes had hidden during his escape. They concluded that his escape "was well planned and involved assistance from several people on the outside". Before the escape, Vikernes gave his mother a letter. In it, he wrote that he had received death threats and another inmate had tried to strangle him shortly after the newspaper article was published. For his actions, thirteen months were added to Vikernes' sentence and he was moved to a prison in Ringerike. In July 2004, he was moved to a maximum-security prison in Trondheim. The last three years of his sentence were spent in Tromsø Prison.

When Vikernes was convicted, it was possible to be released on parole after serving 12 years of a 21-year sentence, but in 2002, before he became eligible, the Norwegian Parliament had extended this to 14 years. In June 2006, after serving 12 years, Vikernes was denied parole by the Department of Criminal Justice for this reason. His lawyer, John Christian Elden, has complained that the policy change is a form of retroactive legislation. Article 97 of the Norwegian constitution forbids any law being given retroactive force. Vikernes was denied parole again in June 2008, although he was allowed to leave Tromsø Prison for short periods to visit his family. His full sentence would run for another seven years. In March 2009, however, his parole was announced. He had then served nearly 15 years of his 21-year sentence. On 22 May 2009, he confirmed that he had been released from prison on probation.

Life after prison
Vikernes continued with Burzum after his release. He released a further three black metal albums: Belus (2010), Fallen (2011) and Umskiptar (2012) and a compilation of re-recorded songs (From the Depths of Darkness). On 27 April 2013, Vikernes posted a song on his official YouTube channel, titled "Back to the Shadows", which Vikernes has stated to be the last metal track to be released by Burzum. In May 2013, he released another ambient album, Sôl austan, Mâni vestan.

In the years following his release from prison, Vikernes became an active video blogger on his YouTube channel, ThuleanPerspective (or Thulêan Perspective). In 2013, Vikernes and his wife released a film called ForeBears, based on bear worship during the time of the Neanderthals, and inspired by the Egyptian Book of the Dead.

Vikernes was one of the recipients of far-right terrorist Anders Behring Breivik's manifesto, which Breivik sent out before launching the 2011 Norway attacks, killing 77 people. Although Vikernes condemned Breivik's actions, this drew the attention of the French authorities.

On 16 July 2013, Vikernes and his wife, a French national, were arrested at their home in Corrèze, France, on suspicion of planning acts of terrorism after his wife bought four rifles. Officials later stated that Vikernes' wife had a legal firearms permit to buy the rifles. The two were later released without charge after police failed to identify any terrorist plans or targets. Vikernes was instead charged by French authorities with inciting racial hatred against Jews and Muslims. This was due to posts on his blog, "Thulean Perspective", which included anti-Semitic posts that were taken down following the charges. Vikernes claimed he had not written the posts, although the blog attributed all posts to him.

In June 2018, Vikernes made comments that he had "moved on" from Burzum on his YouTube channel, saying "bye bye" to the project.

YouTube removed Vikernes's channel from the platform in June 2019, by which point it had 250,000 subscribers. This coincided with an announcement from YouTube that it would be more aggressive in removing "videos alleging that a group is superior in order to justify discrimination, segregation or exclusion".

In late 2019, Vikernes announced on his Twitter that he intended to release another album as Burzum. Titled Thulêan Mysteries, the album was released in March 2020. Vikernes has indicated that this will be his last album under the Burzum name.

Writing

In late 1994, while in prison, Vikernes wrote a Norwegian-language book called Vargsmål ("Varg's Speech"). Vikernes has said he wrote Vargsmål to defend himself against the media. According to Lords of Chaos, Vargsmål became available on the Internet for some time in 1996 but not in a printed form. In 1997, a Norwegian publisher released a paperback edition of the book; its publication was financed by Vikernes's mother, Helene Bore. As of 1999, Vargsmål was being sold by the Nazi organization Heathen Front via its website.

In 1998 he wrote a book called Germansk Mytologi og Verdensanskuelse ("Teutonic Mythology and Worldview") that was published by Cymophane in 2000.

In 2011, Abstract Sounds Books published Vikernes's English book entitled Sorcery and Religion in Ancient Scandinavia, about the religious practices of Scandinavian peoples, particularly during the Stone Age and Bronze Age. According to a review from the music blog Heathen Harvest, the book rejects accepted academic theories, instead focusing on Vikernes's speculation and personalized story-telling.

By late 2003, Vikernes had begun writing articles for Burzum.org, which became the official Burzum website. He also wrote for his personal blog, Thulean Perspective, which was set up in January 2013. The website Ancestral Cult was created by him and his wife.

Vikernes has self-published a tabletop role-playing game named MYFAROG (Mythic Fantasy Role-playing Game). In 2019, he announced that the upcoming ambient album of Burzum, Thulêan Mysteries, was also intended as background music for the game.

Views
In Metal: A Headbanger's Journey, director Sam Dunn described Vikernes as "the most notorious metal musician of all time" due to his crimes as well as his political and religious views. While in prison, Vikernes promoted views which combined Odinism and Esoteric Nazism. Religious studies scholar Egil Asprem characterized Vikernes as "an idol for skinheads with an inclination towards Paganism and for contemporary Pagans with an inclination towards National Socialism". In a 2005 statement on his website, Vikernes wrote that although he had "occasionally used the term 'nazism' to describe [his] ideological foundation", he no longer describes himself as such. He had used the term following his 1994 conviction until the late 1990s and in 2022 stated that he "appreciated" being labelled as a Nazi. Among other things, he did not wish to be associated with anti-Slavic sentiments.

Since the late 1990s he has described his views as "Odalism", which he says encompasses "Paganism, traditional nationalism, racialism and environmentalism". Vikernes also advocates social conservatism, simple living and self-sufficiency (including survivalism). Vikernes has described his own ideology as fiercely anti-modern. According to Eric Brown writing for the International Business Times, Vikernes opposes anything deemed "a threat to a pre-industrial European pagan society, including but not limited to Christianity, Islam, Judaism, capitalism and materialism", and he also "rallies against a perceived international Jewish conspiracy to destroy the traditional European identity".

Vikernes wrote a blog post sympathetic to some of the views of Anders Behring Breivik, but said he suspected Breivik carried out his terrorist attack as part of a Jewish conspiracy. He condemned Breivik for killing innocent Norwegians and called him a "Christian loser", saying the only way to "save Europe" is to "cast aside all Christian and other international nonsense and embrace only the European (i.e. Pagan) values and ideals".

Personal life
Vikernes has a son who was born in 2007 to his current wife, Marie Cachet. They were married the same year. In a 2008 interview, he said he and his wife were expecting a second child (Vikernes' third). After his release, he and his family settled on a small farm in Bø, Telemark. They later moved to Salon-la-Tour, Corrèze department, in France. , he said that he had six children and planned to have more. In March 2021, he announced on Twitter that his wife had given birth to their seventh child, a daughter.

Vikernes is a teetotaler and has never consumed alcohol or other recreational drugs. He also avoids the unnecessary use of pharmaceutical drugs.

After his release from prison, he changed his legal name to Louis Cachet to avoid difficulties with the public, but still goes by Varg Vikernes in daily life.

Vikernes claims he is a distant relative of Norwegian Nazi collaborator Vidkun Quisling by his great-great-grandmother's side.

Lords of Chaos

The 1998 book Lords of Chaos (Feral House) covers the early Norwegian black metal scene. Michael Moynihan, one of the book's authors, was sympathetic with Vikernes and his extremist politics. Moynihan disputed that he is a Nazi or white supremacist. In the 2018 film adaptation, which Varg heavily criticized, he was played by Emory Cohen.

Works

Discography

As Burzum
1992 – Burzum (recorded January 1992)
1993 – Aske (recorded August 1992)
1993 – Det som engang var (recorded April 1992)
1994 – Hvis lyset tar oss (recorded September 1992)
1996 – Filosofem (recorded March 1993)
1997 – Dauði Baldrs (recorded in prison 1994–1995)
1999 – Hliðskjálf (recorded in prison 1998)
2010 – Belus (recorded in 2009)
2011 – Fallen (recorded November 2010)
2011 – From the Depths of Darkness (recorded March 2010)
2012 – Umskiptar (recorded September 2011)
2013 – Sôl austan, Mâni vestan (recorded throughout 2012)
2014 – The Ways of Yore (recorded throughout 2013)
2020 – Thulêan Mysteries (recorded 2015–2020)

Other appearances
1994 – Darkthrone – Transilvanian Hunger (wrote lyrics for four songs)
1995 – Darkthrone – Panzerfaust (wrote lyrics for one song)
1994 – Mayhem – De Mysteriis Dom Sathanas (performed bass guitar)
1993 – Mayhem – Life Eternal (EP, performed bass guitar)
1991 – Old Funeral – Devoured Carcass (EP, performed electric guitar)
1999 – Old Funeral – Join the Funeral Procession (compilation album, performed electric guitar)
1999 – Old Funeral – The Older Ones (compilation album, performed electric guitar)
2002 – Old Funeral – Grim Reaping Norway (live album, performed electric guitar)

Bibliography
 1997 – Vargsmål
 2000 – Germansk mytologi og verdensanskuelse
 2001 – Guide to the Norse Gods and Their Names
 2002 – Irminsûl
 2011 – Sorcery and Religion in Ancient Scandinavia
 2015 – Reflections on European Mythology and Polytheism
 2017 – Paganism Explained, part I: Þrymskviða
 2017 – Paganism Explained, Part II: Little Red Riding Hood & Jack and the Beanstalk
 2018 – Paganism Explained, Part III: The Cult of Mithra & Hymiskviða
 2018 – Paganism Explained, Part IV: Valhöll & Odinn in Yggdrasill
 2019 – Paganism Explained, Part V: Ásgardr, Vanaheimr & the Nine Worlds of Hel

Filmography
1998 – Satan rir media (himself)
2007 – Metal: A Headbanger's Journey (archive footage)
2008 – Pure Fucking Mayhem (archive footage)
2009 – Until the Light Takes Us (himself)
2013 – ForeBears (himself)

References

Sources

Further reading
 Kevin Coogan. 1999. How Black is Black Metal? Hit List 1:1 (February/March), 33–59. Retrieved 23 July 2009.
 Right wing extremism in Norway – 2001, page 8, paragraph title Norsk Hedensk Front, published by Antirasistisk senter and Monitor 
 The extreme right 1999, a report from Antirasistisk senter 
 The Count caught with an AG-3 automatic rifle, news coverage in Aftenposten 
 Police nab The Count after he fled jail, news coverage in Aftenposten
 Arrested Count was heavily armed, news coverage in Aftenposten
 The nun-murders inspired by The count, news coverage in Dagbladet 
 The Count could have inspired the nun-killing, news coverage in Verdens Gang

External links
 Official Burzum and Varg Vikernes home site
 Thulean Perspective – Varg Vikernes' personal blog
 Thulean Perspective – Varg Vikernes' vlog archive

1973 births
Living people
1993 crimes in Norway
20th-century Norwegian criminals
Adherents of Germanic neopaganism
Anti-Christian sentiment in Europe
Antisemitism in Norway
Attacks on churches in Europe
Destruction of religious buildings and structures
Black metal controversies
Black metal guitarists
Critics of Christianity
Male critics of feminism
Mayhem (band) members
Musicians from Bergen
Modern pagan writers
Nordicism
Norwegian activists
Norwegian anti-capitalists
Norwegian anti-communists
Norwegian arsonists
Norwegian black metal musicians
Norwegian bloggers
Norwegian emigrants to France
Norwegian environmentalists
Norwegian hunters
Norwegian male criminals
Norwegian multi-instrumentalists
Norwegian nationalists
Norwegian neo-Nazis
Norwegian modern pagans
Norwegian non-fiction writers
Norwegian people convicted of murder
Norwegian YouTubers
Obscenity controversies in music
Old Funeral members
Anti-Islam sentiment in Europe
Islamophobia in Europe
Outsider musicians
People convicted of arson
People convicted of murder by Norway
People convicted of racial hatred offences
Criminals from Bergen
People from Bø, Telemark
Performers of modern pagan music
Prisoners and detainees of France
Role-playing game designers
Simple living advocates
Survivalists
YouTube controversies
Controversies in Norway
Far-right politics in Norway